Ljubomir "Ljubo" Benčić (2 January 1905 – 24 February 1992) was a Croatian and Yugoslav football player.

Playing career

Club
Spending his entire career at Hajduk Split, Benčić was a renowned right winger and centre forward. He started playing top-flight football in 1921 and by 1923 he became the club's best all-time scorer with a total of 43 goals. In 1925 he played his 100th game for the Whites, and in 1930 he scored his 300th goal for Hajduk. Until his retirement in 1935 he scored an amazing 355 goals in 353 official games for Hajduk, which makes him currently Hajduk's third all-time goalscorer (behind Frane Matošić with 729 and Leo Lemešić with 445 goals). With Hajduk he won two Yugoslav championship titles, in 1927 and 1929, and was also the league's top scorer in 1928, scoring 8 goals in 5 games.

International
Between 1924 and 1927 Benčić earned 5 caps and scored 2 goals for Yugoslavia national football team. He debuted on 28 September 1924 against Czechoslovakia and his last game for the national team was on 28 October 1927 against Czechoslovakia in Prague. The game ended in a disastrous 7–1 defeat, and Benčić scored the only goal for Yugoslavia. He was also part of Yugoslavia's team at the 1928 Summer Olympics, but he did not play in any matches.

Managerial career
After he stopped playing in 1935 he stayed in football and had two stints as manager of Hajduk: from 1939 to 1941 (the last two seasons before World War II, during the war, and then the first few seasons after the war from 1946 to 1948. When he moved to Zagreb he managed NK Milicioner (which later merged with NK Borac to form NK Zagreb). In 1957 he managed Bologna FC with Bernard Vukas. Upon returning to Croatia he managed NK Trešnjevka and NK Zadar. Benčić died in 1992 in Zagreb.

Honours
Yugoslav championship (2): 1927, 1929
Yugoslav championship top scorer: 1928

References

External links
 
Profile at the Football Association of Serbia website 

1905 births
1992 deaths
People from Stari Grad, Croatia
People from the Kingdom of Dalmatia
Association football forwards
Yugoslav footballers
Yugoslavia international footballers
Olympic footballers of Yugoslavia
Footballers at the 1928 Summer Olympics
HNK Hajduk Split players
Yugoslav First League players
Yugoslav football managers
HNK Hajduk Split managers
HNK Rijeka managers
NK Zagreb managers
Bologna F.C. 1909 managers
NK Zadar managers
Yugoslav expatriate football managers
Expatriate football managers in Italy
Yugoslav expatriate sportspeople in Italy